R v Canadian Dredge & Dock Co is a landmark Supreme Court of Canada decision on corporate liability where the Court adopted the English identification doctrine for liability, which states that culpability for acts and mental states of a corporation can be represented by employees and officers on the basis that they are the "directing mind" of the corporate entity.

Background

In 19671973, the Government of Canada issued a series of tenders for dredging operations performed in the Saint Lawrence River and several of the Great Lakes, for which contracts were granted. It was later discovered that a process of bid rigging had occurred, and a complex trial involving twenty defendants took place. Among the defendants were four corporations (Canadian Dredge & Dock Company, Marine Industries Limited, The J.P. Porter Company Limited, and Richelieu Dredging Corporation Inc.) which were charged and convicted with the offences of fraud and conspiracy under the Criminal Code in effect at the time.

The Ontario Court of Appeal dismissed all appeals relating to the convictions, and the defendants appealed to the Supreme Court of Canada on the following issues:

Is the criminal liability of a corporation, when it is based on the misconduct of a directing mind of the corporation, affected because the person who is the directing mind is at the same time acting, in whole or in part, in fraud of the corporation, or wholly or partly for his own benefit or contrary to instructions that he not engage in any illegal activities in the course of his duties?
Was there any evidence that a directing mind of the applicant corporation was acting wholly or in part in fraud of the corporation during the period covered by the indictments herein or acting wholly or in part for his own benefit during that period or contrary to instructions that he not engage in illegal activities in the course of his duties and, if so, is the criminal liability of the corporation affected by any one or more of such circumstances?

Opinion of the Court

All appeals were dismissed. Estey J, for a unanimous Court, held the four companies liable of bid rigging under the identification doctrine, which assigns primary liability  as opposed to vicarious liability  to a corporation where the actor‑employee who physically committed the offence is the ego of it. As he observed:

Therefore, even in mens rea offences, if the court finds the officer or managerial level employee to be a vital organ of the company and virtually its directing mind in the sphere of duty assigned him so that his actions and intent are the action and intent of the company itself, the company can be held criminally liable. The directing mind must act within the scope of his authority  i.e., his actions must be performed within the sector of the corporate operation assigned to him. The sector may be functional, or geographic, or may embrace the entire undertaking of the corporation.

However, the doctrine will not extend to cases where the directing mind intentionally defrauds the corporation and when his wrongful actions form the substantial part of the regular activities of his office. Thus, the identification doctrine only operates where the Crown demonstrates that the action taken by the directing mind:

 was within the field of operation assigned to him,
 was not totally in fraud of the corporation, and
 was by design or result partly for the benefit of the company.

In this appeal, the Crown's case was successful. As Estey J noted:

Impact and subsequent events

Canadian Dredge marked a departure of Canadian jurisprudence in the matter of corporate liability from that determined in other Commonwealth jurisprudence, most notably in Tesco Supermarkets Ltd v Nattrass. As Estey J explained:

However, it did confirm the rejection of US jurisprudence on the subject, which has favoured the use of the doctrine of vicarious liability:

The identification doctrine was further elaborated upon in The Rhone v. The Peter A.B. Widener, where Iacobucci J stated:

In 2003, the Criminal Code was amended to revise the rules relating to criminal liability, including:

 extending liability to organizations that are not corporations,
 distinguishing between offences that involve negligence and those involving other types of fault, and
 prescribing a legal duty for anyone directing the work of another person to take reasonable steps to prevent bodily harm to that person, or any other person, arising from that work or task.

References

Supreme Court of Canada cases
1985 in Canadian case law
Canadian criminal case law
Canadian corporate case law
Dredging